Mehrabad-e Mandegari (also Romanized as Mehrābād-e Māndegārī; also known as Mehrābād) is a village in Kheyrgu Rural District, Alamarvdasht District, Lamerd County, Fars Province, Iran. At the 2006 census, its population was 35, in 6 families.

References 

Populated places in Lamerd County